2004 Emperor's Cup Final was the 84th final of the Emperor's Cup competition. The final was played at National Stadium in Tokyo on January 1, 2005. Tokyo Verdy won the championship.

Match details

See also
2004 Emperor's Cup

References

Emperor's Cup
2004 in Japanese football
Tokyo Verdy matches
Júbilo Iwata matches